Abacetus dorsalis is a species of ground beetle in the subfamily Pterostichinae. It was described by Viktor Motschulsky in 1866.

References

dorsalis
Beetles described in 1866